Co-production is a practice in the delivery of public services in which citizens are involved in the creation of public policies and services. It is contrasted with a transaction based method of service delivery in which citizens consume public services which are conceived of and provided by governments. Co-production is possible in the private and non-profit sectors in addition to the public sector. In contrast with traditional citizen involvement, citizens are not only consulted, but are part of the conception, design, steering, and management of services.

Some definitions 
An organisation called the Co-production Network for Wales describes co-production as "an asset-based approach to public services that enables people providing and people receiving services to share power and responsibility, and to work together in equal, reciprocal and caring relationships". According to Governance International, co-production is about "public service organisations and citizens making better use of each other’s assets, resources and contributions".

Emergence 
Experiments on co-production on public services have been launched in many countries, from Denmark to Malaysia, the UK and the US.

The term 'co-production' was originally coined in the late 1970s by Elinor Ostrom and colleagues at Indiana University to explain why neighbourhood crime rates went up in Chicago when the city's police officers retreated from the street into cars. Similarly to Jane Jacobs' assessment of the importance of long-time residents to the safety and vitality of New York's old neighbourhoods, Ostrom noted that by becoming detached from people and their everyday lives on the streets, Chicago's police force lost an essential source of insider information, making it harder for them to do their work as effectively.

What Ostrom and her colleagues were recognising was that services – in this case policing – rely as much upon the unacknowledged knowledge, assets and efforts of service 'users' as the expertise of professional providers. It was the informal understanding of local communities and the on the ground relationships they had developed with police officers that had helped keep crime levels down. In short, the police needed the community as much as the community needed the police.
The concept of the 'core economy', first articulated by Neva Goodwin and subsequently developed by Edgar S. Cahn, is helpful in explaining this further.

The core economy is made up of all the resources embedded in people's everyday lives – time, energy, wisdom, experience, knowledge and skills – and the relationships between them – love, empathy, watchfulness, care, reciprocity, teaching and learning. Similar to the role played by the operating system of a computer, the core economy is the basic, yet essential, platform upon which 'specialist programmes' in society, the market economy and public services run. Our specialised services dealing with crime, education, care, health and so on are all underpinned by the family, the neighbourhood, community and civil society.

This understanding has helped to radically reframe the potential role of 'users' and 'professionals' in the process of producing services. Far from being passive consumers, or needy drains on public finances, people, their family, friends and communities are understood as important agents with the capacity to design and even deliver services with improved outcomes.

Professionals, for their part, need to find ways of engaging meaningfully with the core economy; helping it to grow, flourish and realise its full potential – not atrophy as a result of neglect or exploitation. Significantly, as the New Economics Foundation (NEF) note:

"This is not about consultation or participation – except in the broadest sense. The point is not to consult more, or involve people more in decisions; it is to encourage them to use the human skills and experience they have to help deliver public or voluntary services. It is, according to Elizabeth Hoodless at Community Service Volunteers, about "broadening and deepening" public services so that they are no longer the preserve of professionals or commissioners, but a shared responsibility, both building and using a multi-faceted network of mutual support".

Canada 
In Canada, a team of professionals has created a prototype based on this approach: Co-Create Canada, which aims to increase citizens' trust in government by connecting citizens who want to be engaged in the development of policies and programs with government change agents.  This would enable the co-creation of new solutions aimed at improving policies and programs and leverage dispersed resources both inside and outside of government to solve problems faster.  The model would employ several strategies (Ref. Adamira Tijerino):

 Connecting citizens who want to get engaged in a particular area of interest with public servants who are specialists and involved in the area of interest.
 Humanizing public servants by allowing them to go beyond their job description and empowering them by recognizing their individual skill sets (via the use of open badges).
 Develop a wide range of tools (e.g., Connect.gc.ca website, mobile app and engagement mechanisms) to serve as the platform for these connections, leveraging current government IT infrastructure.
 Propose an evaluation component to measure success.

What has emerged from this thinking is a new agenda; a challenge to the way professionals are expected to work, and to policy-makers who are setting targets as indicators of success; a way of helping to explain why things currently do not work as well as they could; a call for an alternative way of doing things.

Italy 
By the initiative of three mental health professionals and a group of volunteers (now the association ‘180amici’), a centre co‐produced by the public mental health services and a citizen association with many members with lived experiences of mental health issues and their family members opened in 2008. The centre - named "Marco Cavallo" - was officially recognized by the Apulia region as an experimental centre of co‐production in 2012.

In 2015, the association ‘180amici’ asked the Italian National Research Council to evaluate the Marco Cavallo Center using a collaborative approach. The research compared the coproduced Marco Cavallo Center to mental health services in the same region and found that users of the co‐produced centre reported a significantly reduced rate of hospitalizations compared with users of traditional mental health services. Furthermore, 39% of users of the co‐produced centre reported a reduction or even withdrawal from psychiatric medications against 22% of the comparison group. In the participants' experiences, the co‐produced service focused on (i) parity and respectful relationships, (ii) people's strengths, (iii) freedom, (iv) psychological continuity, (v) social inclusion, and (vi) recovery orientation.

United Kingdom
The 4Pi National Involvement Standards (developed and produced by people with lived experience) were formally launched at the National Survivor User Network (NSUN) AGM 29 January 2013. This framework established some basic principles to encourage people to think of involvement in terms of principles, purpose, presence, process and impact(4Pi). The 4Pi National Involvement Standards influences people beyond the boundaries of NSUN.

Wales
The Co-production Network for Wales was launched in May 2016. The project is funded by the Big Lottery for three years and is a partnership between the Co-production Network for Wales, WCVA and the project host Cartrefi Cymru.

Their collective aim is to help transform our public services by embedding co-production as the primary approach to commissioning, design, delivery and evaluation in Wales. The Network patrons are Edgar Cahn and Julian Tudor-Hart.

Namibia 
The Shack Dwellers Federation of Namibia, which is composed of women-led savings groups in low-income areas, has worked with the city government of Windhoek to access sanitation services and secure housing. In addition to improving living standards, the federation's self-help strategy for co-production aims to build political influence and organizing capacity amongst low-income urban residents.

New Zealand 
The initiation of preserving the environment for the future generation alongside protecting economic, social and cultural well-being is a great example of co-production in public services. Iwi, hapū, and community groups were initiated to join the monitoring, protection and enhancement of the natural resources.

The principles of effective co-governance and co-management were:

 to build and maintain the common understanding of goals and expected achievements;
 to build the frameworks, processes, structures, and understanding about the way people work together;
 to involve people with needed experiences and capacity;
 to be transparent about the process, performance, achievements and challenges;
 to plan for financial sustainability and to be ready for change.

Based on this principles, many co-operational events took place. For example, North Otago aquatic restoration. The success was based also on the deep analysis of the people's values and needs. Only because North Otago meant a lot to people they had a strong incentive to participate in the restoration.

Concepts of co-production 
Co-production is based on the production of own services and resources by citizens, completely or in part. It involves the willingness of citizens or users together with public services to design, implement and improve the delivery of services in order to innovate and transform public services. One striking example is to involve vulnerable groups, such as patients with psychotic disorders and severe functional impairments in co-producing their healthcare, and to use technology assist this process. Co-production includes co-management and co-governance.

Co-management 
The concept of co-management implies the introduction of a third party (citizens, users, private organization or other public organization) into the process of management of the delivery of the service. The involvement of the third party actually takes place from the nineteenth century, however, it was not defined as a concept back then.

Co-management creates the phenomenon by bringing relations between different organizations to internal production process and creating new networks, which in some cases brings strong positive impact, however, can be seen as negative due to the lack of accountability and increasing competition between different networks.

Co-governance 
The concept of co-governance lies under the arrangement of the third party and public agencies if decision making and planning of public services.

Co-design 
Co-designing refers to the process of a collective knowledge sharing and knowledge creation.

Key components of a co-design process should involve:

 Intentionally involving target users in designing solutions;
 Postponing design decisions until after gathering feedback;
 Synthesising feedback from target users into insights;
 Developing solutions based on feedback.

Co-delivery 
Co-delivery implies the improvement of outcomes with a collective effort. It is usually implemented as non-profit organization.

Co-assessment 
Co-assessment refers to the monitoring of public service quality and outcomes. Co-assessment of public services brings a radically different perspective to deciding what works – and what doesn’t. However, co-assessment can carry potential risks such as: lack of knowledge, lack of resources, time consumption.

Challenges 
Co-production, as a method, approach and mind-set, is very different from traditional models of service provision. As has been shown, it fundamentally alters the relationship between service providers and users; it emphasises people as active agents, not passive beneficiaries; and, in large part because of this alternative process, it tends to lead towards better, more preventative outcomes in the long-term.

Because of its radically different nature, however, people wishing to practice co-production face a number of significant challenges. As NEF/NESTA comments:

"Overall, the challenge seems to amount to one clear problem. Co-production, even in the most successful and dramatic examples, barely fits the standard shape of public services or charities or the systems we have developed to 'deliver' support, even though [in the UK] policy documents express ambitions to empower and engage local communities, to devolve power and increase individuals' choice and control."

This misfit makes practising co-production difficult, and mainstreaming good practice particularly so. Existing structures and frameworks work against, not with, co-production. In order for it to flourish as a viable alternative to the expensive and in many cases failing, status quo change needs to take place.

NEF/NESTA highlight four areas where such change will be required;

 Funding and Commissioning: Commissioners of public money will need to change their established ways of doing things. Applying strict quantitative targets and stipulating rigid, short-term outputs with a mind to economic efficiency acts as a barrier to co-produced service models. In order to 'commission for change' narrow outputs need to be broadened and complemented by outcomes based commissioning.
 Generating evidence and making the case for co-production: The obvious reason why many commissioning frameworks favour outputs over outcomes is that they are simply measured, making it deceptively easy to evaluate success or failure. But real success is not easily measurable. Nor are many of the preventative benefits of co-production easy to quantify. Making the case for co-production and capturing its complex and myriad benefits is a key challenge.
 Taking successful approaches to scale: It is fair to say that the majority of examples where co-production is being successfully practiced take place at a local scale. To a great extent this has been instrumental to their success; they are rooted in local realities, have grown organically from the ground based on local assets and ideas and emphasise the importance of face-to-face relationships. There is a potential tension to be overcome here; ensuring that a service remains locally rooted, whilst simultaneously expanding the scope of coverage nationally. Where this has been achieved (see KeyRing, Shared Lives and LAC in Australia) the tendency towards replication and blueprinting has been strongly resisted. Instead of simplistically transplanting a 'model' in new regions, these organisations have taken forward a common 'method' that involves engaging with local assets and resources in a consistent way.

Co-production also suits smaller organisations (traditionally those in the third sector) that are more used to working in less structured and hierarchical ways. This is something that large public sector structures are much less used to doing. If co-production is to be a mainstream way of working across public sector services, a structural and cultural shift will also need to take place.

 Developing required professional skills: Years of working to narrowly defined roles and job descriptions has understandably led to many public service professionals seeing their 'clients' through circumscribed lenses; as patients that need to be cared for, rather than people who could be enabled. It can also be difficult for any professional to relinquish control and 'hand over the stick'; not only does this challenge occupational identities but it also confers a greater sense of risk – co-production can be 'messy' and is inimical to rigid control. If the hearts and minds of those delivering services on the ground cannot be changed, and if the necessary skills associated with relinquishing control are not embedded, co-production is likely to be constrained.

A Service User's Perspective
"The language and movement for co-production is one expression of this. But it is a slow process and sadly whatever the politics of governments; whether they favour state or market, too often for all the rhetoric, other people still make key decisions about us and our lives, whether we are talking about the NHS, welfare reform or the education system. And we know that this is inefficient and wasteful. Instead, listen to people on the receiving end. Make sure discussions and decision-making processes are as accessible and inclusive as possible so their diverse views and voices can be heard. Most of all, subject schemes for co-production to a ruthless test. Service users and their organisations must always be in the room, on the committee, in the decision-making body. Then we're really likely to get somewhere – doing it together." — Peter Beresford OBE

Criticisms and responses 

 It makes additional demands of people who rely on services and who are by definition already 'in need'. However, a response to this is that the active engagement of people who have previously been seen as passive recipients is largely positive, enabling them to make services work for them, growing their own confidence and capacity. Nevertheless, in co-production approaches it is important to consider equality around the burden placed on people's time.
 It is a cover for the withdrawal of services and minimises the accountability of the state; blurring the lines of responsibility for the quality of service. If co-production is done for the wrong reasons this can be the case. It is a question of means and ends. The key here is to emphasise that 'co' requires input both from people who deliver services and people who have been seen as 'recipients' of them. They are likely to play different roles and power will be distributed differently in co-produced services but contribution from both is essential, otherwise services become 'self-organised' which is a different thing entirely.
 Co-produced services will lead to a postcode lottery for service users: It is true that services will look different in different areas but that is to be expected as the assets, resources and needs identified by communities in different areas will also look different. There is still the need for a central role to be played to ensure consistency in approach and to be clear that everyone is enabled to play a role in co-production but the assumption that identikit services produce the best outcomes for people is questioned by co-production.
 Its just 'participation' by a new name: Co-production is different from 'voice' based interventions as it recognises that it is critical for people to play a role in the activity of delivering services, not simply to contribute ideas to shaping new services that rely on professionals to deliver them.

Resources and examples
 Interactive Good Practice Co-Production Catalogue from Wales
The coproduced Marco Calvallo Mental Health Center
 Skills for Health Work with people and significant others to develop services to improve their mental health
 Co-Production Network 
 Co-production Wales, All in this together
 Parents_as_Pre-school_Education_Service_Co-producers_in_Lithuania
 Co-production - Enhancing the role of citizens in governance and service delivery (EU 2018)

See also
 Big Society
 Community politics
 UK public service law

Notes

References
 Alford, J. (1998), A public management road less traveled: clients as co-producers of public services. Australian Journal of Public Administration, 57 (4), 128-137.
 Alford, J. (2007), Engaging public sector clients: from service delivery to co-production. Houndmills, Basingstoke: Palgrave Macmillan.
 Barnes, M., Harrison, S., Mort, M., Shardlow, P. and Wistow G. (1999),  'The new management of community care: users groups, citizenship and co-production' in G.Stoker,  New Management of British Local Governance. Houndmills: Macmillan.
 Tony Bovaird (2007), "Beyond engagement and participation – user and community co-production of public services", Public Administration Review, 67 (5): 846-860 (2007).
 Tony Bovaird and Elke Loeffler (2010), "User and community co-production of public services and public policies through collective decision-making: the role of emerging technologies" in T. Brandsen and Marc Holzer (Eds), The Future of Governance. Newark, NJ: National Center for Public Performance.
 Tony Bovaird and Elke Loeffler (2012), "From Engagement to Co-production: How Users and Communities Contribute to Public Services" in Taco Brandsen and Victor Pestoff (Eds), New Public Governance, the Third Sector and Co-Production. London: Routledge.
 Matthew Horne and Tom Shirley (2009), Co-production in public services: a new partnership with citizens. London: Cabinet Office.
 Roger Dunston, Alison Lee, David Boud, Pat Brodie and Mary Chiarella (2008), " Co-Production and Health System Reform – From Re-Imagining To Re-Making", Australian Journal of Public Administration, 68 (1): 39 – 52.
 Elke Löffler, Tony Bovaird, Salvador Parrado and Greg van Ryzin (2008), "If you want to go fast, walk alone. If you want to go far, walk together": Citizens and the co-production of public services. Report to the EU Presidency. Paris: Ministry of Finance, Budget and Public Services.
 Brudney, J. and England, R. 1983. Towards a definition of the co-production concept. Public Administration Review, 43 (10), 59-65.
 Cahn, E.S. 2001. No More Throw-Away People: the Co-Production Imperative. Washington DC: Essential Books.
 Hyde, P. and Davies, H.T.O. 2004. Service design, culture and performance: collusion and co-production in health care. Human Relations, 57 (1), 1407–1426.
 Joshi, A. and Moore, M. 2003. Institutionalised Co-production: Unorthodox Public Service Delivery in Challenging Environments. Brighton: IDS.
 Kretzmann, J. and McKnight, J. 1993. Building Communities from the Inside-Out: A Path Toward Finding and Mobilizing a Community's Assets.
 Lovelock, C. and Young, R.F. 1979. 'Look to customers to increase productivity', Harvard Business Review, 57 (May–June), 168-178.
 Needham, C. (2009), Co-production: an emerging evidence base for adult social care transformation. SCIE Research Briefing 31. London: Social Care Institute for Excellence.
 Richard Normann (1984), Service Management: Strategy and Leadership in the Service Business, John Wiley and Sons.
 Ostrom, E. 1996. Crossing the great divide: coproduction, synergy and development. World Development. 24 (6), 1073-87.
 Parks, R.B. et al. 1981. Consumers as coproducers of public services: some economic and institutional considerations. Policy Studies Journal, 9 (Summer), 1,001-11.
 Percy, S. 1984. Citizen participation in the co-production of urban services. Urban Affairs Quarterly, 19 (4), 431 – 446.
 Pestoff,  V. and Brandsen, T. 2007, Co-production: the third sector and the delivery of public services. London: Routledge.
Pocobello, R., Sehity, T. el, Negrogno, L., Minervini, C., Guida, M., & Venerito, C. n.d. Comparison of a co-produced mental health service to traditional services: A co-produced mixed-methods cross-sectional study. International Journal of Mental Health Nursing, n/a(n/a). https://doi.org/10.1111/inm.12681
 Ramirez, R. 1999. 'Value co-production: intellectual origins and implications for practice and research', Strategic Management Journal, 20 (1), 49-65.
 Sharp, E. 1980. Towards a new understanding of urban services and citizen participation: the co-production concept. Midwest Review of Public Administration, 14, 105-118.
 Walker, P. 2002. Co-production. In Mayo, E. and Moore, H. (eds). Building the Mutual State: Findings from Virtual Thinktank. London: New Economics Foundation.
 Warren, R., Harlow, K.S. and Rosentraub, M.S. 1982. 'Citizen participation in services: methodological and policy issues in co-production research', Southwestern Review of Management and Economics, 2: 41-55.
 Whitaker, G. 1980. Co-production: citizen participation in service delivery. Public Administration Review, 40, 240-246.
 Wickström, S. 1996. The customer as co-producer. European Journal of Marketing, 30(4):6-19.
 Zeleny, M. 1978. Towards Self-Service Society. New York: Columbia University Press.

External links
"The Parable of the Blobs and Squares", animated video, on why co-production matters.
Tijerino, Adamira (2014). Video

Public services